Naihati Union is a union parishad in Rupsa Upazila of Khulna District, in Khulna Division, Bangladesh.

References

Unions of Rupsa Upazila
Populated places in Khulna District